The Huckle-Buck and Robbins' Nest is an album by trumpeter Buck Clayton which was recorded in 1953 and released on the Columbia label.

Track listing 
 "The Hucklebuck" (Andy Gibson, Roy Alfred) – 20:02
 "Robbins' Nest" (Illinois Jacquet, Sir Charles Thompson) – 17:39

Personnel 
Buck Clayton – trumpet
Joe Newman – trumpet
Henderson Chambers, Urbie Green – trombone
Lem Davis – alto saxophone 
Julian Dash – tenor saxophone
Charles Fowlkes – baritone saxophone 
 Sir Charles Thompson – piano, celeste 
Freddie Green – guitar
Walter Page – bass 
Jo Jones – drums

References 

1954 albums
Buck Clayton albums
Columbia Records albums
Albums produced by George Avakian